Bujalance is a town located in the heart of Andalucia, southern Spain, in the province of Córdoba. , it had 7910 inhabitants.

Its name is derived from the Arabic term Burj al-Hansh. Among its monuments and places of interest are the Moorish Castle of Bujalance (10th century), the church of Nuestra Señora de la Asunción), and hermitages and olive groves.

References

Municipalities in the Province of Córdoba (Spain)